The Kettle Moraine Scenic Drive is a designated scenic route in southeastern Wisconsin that links the two units of the Kettle Moraine State Forest. The route traverses through scenic and historic areas, including landscape shaped by glaciers from the latest ice age, known as the Wisconsin glaciation.

Route description
Kettle Moraine Scenic Drive generally follows county and local roads. It begins near Whitewater – at the southern expanse of the Kettle Moraine State Forest's southern unit, the drive takes a northeast trek and passes through six counties: Walworth, Jefferson, Waukesha, Washington, Fond du Lac, and Sheboygan. The route's northern terminus is near Sheboygan County Broughton Marsh Park northwest of Elkhart Lake.

History
The idea of a route along the Kettle Moraine was believed to be conceived in the early 1940s by the Kettle Moraine Committee of the Izaak Walton League – Milwaukee Chapter, which was the backbone behind the development of the Kettle Moraine State Forest units.  The first surveying of the area did not begin until 1946. The Wisconsin Highway Commission approved the route in 1948 and the first paving project was completed in 1950.

Attractions along the drive
The drive passes by various opportunities for recreation and tourism in the Kettle Moraine area.  Access is provided to sightseeing, hiking, biking, camping, cross-country skiing and fishing facilities.

The following state parks and forests are accessible via the scenic drive – from south to north:
Kettle Moraine – Southern Unit
Glacial Drumlin State Trail
Kettle Moraine – Lapham Peak Unit
Kettle Moraine – Pike Lake Unit
Kettle Moraine – Northern Unit

The following historical sites are accessible via the scenic drive – from south to north:
Old World Wisconsin in Eagle
Holy Hill near Hubertus
Sylvanus Wade House in Greenbush
Parnell Tower, an observation tower near Parnell
The north terminus and the northernmost several miles of pavement was part of the original track circuit for Road America in 1950. The corner at the north terminus was called the "Marsh Turn", and it is marked with a historical marker. There is also a historical marker along the Kettle Moraine Scenic Drive in the city of Elkhart Lake marking the site of the 1951 and 1952 start/finish line.

Gallery

Major intersections

|}

References

External links

Kettle Moraine Scenic Drive (Wisconsin Department of Natural Resources)

State highways in Wisconsin
Tourist attractions in Walworth County, Wisconsin
Tourist attractions in Jefferson County, Wisconsin
Tourist attractions in Waukesha County, Wisconsin
Tourist attractions in Washington County, Wisconsin
Tourist attractions in Fond du Lac County, Wisconsin
Tourist attractions in Sheboygan County, Wisconsin
Kettle Moraine State Forest